The Church of St John the Baptist in Carhampton, Somerset, England is a Grade I listed Anglican church.

The first church in the village stood to the east of the present church and was dedicated to St Carantoc a Welsh monk of the 6th century.

The present church was mainly built in the Perpendicular period of the fifteenth century, however it was largely rebuilt in 1862–1863 with further work in tower rebuilt 1868–70 to rebuild the tower and add a vestry. It previously had a low tower with a tiled top.

The wooden pulpit and a painted wooden screen from the previous building and date from around 1500, along with some of the monuments and bells from the earlier church.

The church is within the benefice of  Dunster, Carhampton, Withycombe w Roduish, Timberscombe and Wootton Courtenay, which is part of the Exmoor deanery and the Taunton archdeanery.

See also

 List of Grade I listed buildings in West Somerset
 List of towers in Somerset
 List of ecclesiastical parishes in the Diocese of Bath and Wells

References

External links
 

Church of England church buildings in West Somerset
Churches completed in 1863
Carhampton
Grade I listed buildings in West Somerset